John William Elmer Thomas (September 8, 1876 – September 19, 1965) was a native of Indiana who moved to Oklahoma Territory in 1901, where he practiced law in Lawton. After statehood, he was elected to the first state senate, representing the Lawton area. Representative and a Senator from Oklahoma. In 1922, he ran successfully on the Democratic Party ticket for the U.S. House of Representatives. He was the Democratic nominee for the U.S. Senate in 1926; he won this race and held the seat until 1950, when he lost the party nomination to A.S. (Mike) Monroney. Thomas returned to a private law practice in Washington, D.C., and in 1957 moved his practice back to Lawton, where he died in 1965.

Early life
Born on a farm in Putnam County, Indiana, near Greencastle, to William and Elizabeth Thomas on September 8, 1876, he attended the common schools; graduated from the Central Normal College (now Canterbury College), Danville, Indiana, in 1897 and from the graduate department of DePauw University, Greencastle, Indiana, in 1900.  Thomas studied law, was admitted to the Indiana bar in 1897 and to the Oklahoma bar in 1900, and commenced practice in Oklahoma City, Oklahoma; moved to Lawton, Oklahoma, in 1901 and continued the practice of law.

Political career

Oklahoma state politics
He was elected a member of the first state senate in 1907, where he served until 1920. He also served as president pro tempore 1910–1913, founded the Medicine Park Resort and  oversaw the state's first fish hatchery at Medicine Park, Oklahoma. He was an unsuccessful candidate for election in 1920 to the Sixty-seventh Congress. In 1922, he ran again and won, elected as a Democrat to the Sixty-eighth and Sixty-ninth Congresses (March 4, 1923–March 3, 1927). As a member of the Oklahoma delegation to the House of Representatives, he supported Indian education legislation, the McNary-Haugen Farm Bill and legislation expanding credit for farmers. He also served on the House Committee on Public Lands and Claims

National politics
Elmer Thomas was not a candidate for renomination in 1926, having become a candidate for United States Senator; elected as a Democrat to the United States Senate in 1926, defeating former governor Jack Walton. He attacked the Coolidge administration as insensitive to farmers, then reluctantly backed Hoover's Agricultural Marketing Act of 1929, and supported paying the Veteran's Bonus. He was reelected in 1932, he actively supported Franklin D. Roosevelt and the New Deal. Specifically, Senator Thomas proposed an amendment known as the Thomas Amendment, to the Agricultural Adjustment Act, intended to help farmers financially by empowering the president to reduce the gold backing for dollars and to print bills backed by silver alone when cash became depressively tight. Lewis Douglas, Roosevelt's budget director, was furious about this threat to the gold standard, and in its final form the amendment was weaker. Thomas was also a reliable friend to Indians and served as chairman of the Committee on Indian Affairs between 1935 and 1944.

Roosevelt visited Oklahoma in 1938 and campaigned for Senator Thomas' reelection. Thomas won handily. He was very interested in international affairs, having supported the League of Nations, the Kellogg-Briand Peace Pact, and the World Court. He voted for neutrality in 1935 and 1937, but said his main concern was American military preparedness. He had served in the Army as a lieutenant colonel assigned to military intelligence and retained that rank as a member of the Reserves. In June 1938 he became chair of the Sub-Committee on Military Appropriations, and after inspecting numerous bases found the country's defenses "in critical condition." During World War II his subcommittee secured funding for the top-secret atomic bomb project.

Senator Thomas was reelected in 1944, becoming the third-ranking senator in seniority. He chaired the Committee on Agriculture and Forestry from 1944 to 1946 and 1949 to 1950. He attended food conferences in Quebec and Copenhagen in 1945 and 1946 and toured Europe in 1949 as part of an audit of Marshall Plan funds.

End of political career
Thomas was challenged in the Democratic primary by A.S. Mike Monroney in 1950. This time Thomas lost his bid for the nomination, and gave up his seat to Monroney in January 1951. In semi-retirement, he engaged in the practice of law in Washington, D.C., until August 1957, then returned to Lawton, Oklahoma, where he died September 19, 1965. He was interred in Highland Cemetery in Lawton.

Honors
Elmer Thomas was inducted into the Oklahoma Hall of Fame in 1932.

Elmer Thomas Lake 
Senator Thomas was behind the creation of Medicine Park, situated in the Wichita Mountains of Oklahoma. A lake named after the senator lies to the west of the town, just northwest of Lawton.

References

Further reading
 Rook, Elizabeth Thomas. Senator: 1876-1965 The Life and Career of Elmer Thomas (Lulu, 2015).

External links

 Elmer Thomas Collection and Photograph Series at the Carl Albert Center
 

DePauw University alumni
Democratic Party United States senators from Oklahoma
1876 births
1965 deaths
People from Putnam County, Indiana
People from Lawton, Oklahoma
Democratic Party members of the United States House of Representatives from Oklahoma
Democratic Party Oklahoma state senators